Kaliotoxin (KTX) inhibits potassium flux through the Kv1.3 voltage-gated potassium channel and calcium-activated potassium channels by physically blocking the channel-entrance and inducing a conformational change in the K+-selectivity filter of the channel.

Sources
KTX is a neurotoxin derived from the scorpion Androctonus mauretanicus mauretanicus, which is found in the Middle East and North Africa. (Crest M et al.)

Chemistry
Kaliotoxin is a 4-kDa polypeptide chain, containing 38 amino acids. The formula is C171H283N55O49S8. The sequence has a large homology with iberiotoxin from Buthus tumulus, charybdotoxin from  Leiurus quinquestriatus and noxiustoxin from  Centruroides noxius.
An Important site of the toxin is the K27 side chain (a lysine at place 27 of the protein sequence), which enters the pore and protrudes into the selectivity filter of the channel. (Lange A et al., Korukottu J et al.)

Target
KTX binds to the Kv1.3 voltage-gated potassium channel and the Calcium-activated potassium channels (BK channels). (Lange A et al., Crest M et al., Zachariae U et al., Aiyar J et al.,) 
These channels control several regulating processes, including neurotransmitter release, heart rate, insulin secretion, smooth muscle contraction. (Wickenden A et al.) Kv1.3 channels also play a critical role in regulating the function of effector memory T cells, the subset implicated in many autoimmune disorders, and blockade of Kv1.3 channels by kaliotoxin ameliorates disease in rat models of multiple sclerosis and bone resorption due to periodontitis. (Beeton C et al., Valverde P et al., Cahalan and Chandy)

Mode of action
The toxin binds to the external vestibule of the channel, and a critical lysine residue (K27), protrudes into the pore and plugs it (Aiyar J et al., 1995, 1996). The positively charged amino-group of the K27 chain fits into the selectivity filter near the G77 chain (Glycine) of the channel, causing a conformational change of the channels´ selectivity filter (Aiyar J et al., 1996). Thereby the hydrophobic groups of the K27 side chain replace water molecules in the entry region of the pore. So the pore is blocked by a direct plug into the pore region of the channel and a conformational change in the selectivity filter is induced. By determining the solution structure of kaliotoxin and related toxins, and by using complementary mutagenesis and electrostatic compliance, it was possible to determine the architecture of the toxin binding site at the outer vestibule of the Kv1.3 channel (Aiyar J et al., 1995, 1996). This vestibule is - 28-32 A wide at its outer margin, - 28-34 A wide at its base, and -4-8 A deep; the pore is 9-14 ~A wide at its external entrance and tapers to a width of 4-5 A at a depth of - 5-7 A from the vestibule (Aiyar J et al., 1995, 1996). These dimensions are remarkably similar to that of the outer vestibule of the KcsA bacterial channel that was determined by X-ray crystallography (Doyle et al., MacKinnon et al., Lange A et al., Catterall WA et al.)

References

1. Korukottu J et al., High-resolution 3D structure determination of kaliotoxin by solid-state NMR spectroscopy. PLoS ONE. 2008 Jun 4;3(6):e2359

2. Zachariae U et al., The molecular mechanism of toxin-induced conformational changes in a potassium channel: relation to C-type inactivation. Structure. 2008 May;16(5):747-54

3. Catterall WA et al., Voltage-gated ion channels and gating modifier toxins. Toxicon. 2007 Feb;49(2):124-41

4. Lange A et al., Toxin-induced conformational changes in a potassium channel revealed by solid-state NMR. Nature. 2006 Apr 13;440(7086):959-62

5. Kunqian Y et al., Computational simulations of interactions of scorpion toxins with the voltage-gated potassium ion channel. Biophys J. 2004 Jun;86(6):3542-55

6. Wickenden A et al., K(+) channels as therapeutic drug targets. Pharmacol Ther. 2002 Apr-May;94(1-2):157-82.

7. Crest M et al., Kaliotoxin, a novel peptidyl inhibitor of neuronal BK-type Ca(2+)-activated K+ channels characterized from Androctonus mauretanicus mauretanicus venom. J Biol Chem. 1992 Jan 25;267(3):1640-7

8. Aiyar J et al., Topology of the pore-region of a K+ channel revealed by the NMR-derived structures of scorpion toxins. [Neuron 1995 15:1169-1181]

9. Aiyar J. et al., The signature sequence of voltage-gated potassium channels projects into the external vestibule.[J Biol Chem. 1996 Dec 6;271(49):31013-6]

10. Beeton C et al., Selective blocking of voltage-gated K+ channels improves experimental autoimmune encephalomyelitis and inhibits T cell activation. [J Immunol. 2001 Jan 15;166(2):936-44]

11. Valverde P et al., Selective blockade of voltage-gated potassium channels reduces inflammatory bone resorption in experimental periodontal disease. [J Bone Miner Res. 2004 Jan;19(1):155-64.]

12. Cahalan MD and Chandy KG. The functional network of ion channels in T lymphocytes. [Immunol Rev. 2009 Sep;231(1):59-87.]

13. Doyle DA et al., The structure of the potassium channel: molecular basis of K+ conduction and selectivity. [Science. 1998 Apr 3;280(5360):69-77]

14. MacKinnon R et al., Structural conservation in prokaryotic and eukaryotic potassium channels. [Science. 1998 Apr 3;280(5360):106-9]

Ion channel toxins